Der Teufel vom Mühlenberg is an East German film. It was released in 1955, and sold 4,301,895 tickets.

References

External links
 

1955 films
East German films
Films_based_on_fairy_tales
German adventure films
1955 adventure films
1950s German films